Étienne Marcel (between 1302 and 131031 July 1358) was provost of the merchants of Paris under King John II of France, called John the Good (Jean le Bon). He distinguished himself in the defence of the small craftsmen and guildsmen who made up most of the city population.

As a delegate of the Third Estate, he played an important role in the general assemblies held during the Hundred Years' War. In 1357, he found himself at the head of a reform movement that tried to institute a controlled French monarchy, confronting the royal power of the Dauphin or heir to the throne.

Personal life

Étienne Marcel was born into the wealthy Parisian bourgeoisie, the son of the clothier Simon Marcel and Isabelle Barbou. Like Jacob van Artevelde in Flanders, his upbringing in the urban upper class brought him close to the powerful; he grew up at a time when towns were becoming a political force, especially Paris, which was the largest city in western Europe (its population in about 1328 is estimated at 200,000 people).

Étienne Marcel first married Jeanne de Dammartin, and then Marguerite des Essars, who survived him.

Political career

In 1354 he succeeded Jean de Pacy as provost of the Parisian merchants, representing the mercantile leaders of the Third Estate of the Estates General, at a time of great change; one of his earliest assemblies – that of 1355 – aimed at controlling the kingdom's finances.

In 1356, King John was taken prisoner by the English after the Battle of Poitiers. On 17 October, his heir, the Dauphin Charles, called together the Estates General. In conjunction with Robert le Coq, Bishop of Laon, Marcel played a leading part; a committee of eighty members, formed by the two, pressed their demands for new taxes with such insistence that the Dauphin dismissed the body. Meanwhile, to protect the eastern approach to Paris, Marcel constructed a fortified gateway (the original  Bastille).

Financial straits, not least dealing with the ransom for King John, obliged the Dauphin to summon them once more on 3 February 1357, with the consequence being the promulgation of a great edict of reform. John the Good forbade its being put into effect, whereupon a conflict ensued between Marcel and the Dauphin, Marcel endeavouring to set up Charles the Bad, King of Navarre, in opposition to John. The Estates General assembled again on 13 January 1358, and on 22 February the populace of Paris, led by Marcel, invaded the palace and murdered the marshals of Champagne Jean de Conflans, and of Normandy, Robert de Clermont, before the prince's eyes.

The assemblies had proven incapable of resolving the crisis in the kingdom. The murder of the nobles undermined Marcel's support from the aristocracy. The Dauphin, Charles, was now able to take power and save the crown for the Valois line.

Thenceforth, Marcel was openly hostile to the throne. After vainly hoping that the insurrection of the Jacquerie might turn to his advantage, he next supported the King of Navarre, whose armed bands infested the neighbourhood of Paris. On the night of 31 July, Marcel was about to open the gates of the capital to them, but Jean Maillart prevented the execution of this design. Marcel was assassinated by the guards at the Porte Saint-Antoine; the Parisian bourgeoisie believed he had gone too far in opposing the king, and thought he might hand over the city to the English. During the following days, his adherents were likewise put to death, and the Dauphin was able to re-enter Paris.

References

1358 deaths
Year of birth unknown
Year of birth uncertain
Politicians from Paris
14th-century French businesspeople
Provost of the Merchants of Paris